The South Portland Street Suspension Bridge is a suspension-type footbridge across the River Clyde in Glasgow, Scotland linking the City Centre on the north side to the Laurieston and Gorbals districts on the south side.

It was built between 1851 and 1853, replacing a temporary wooden bridge on the same site (used from 1832 to 1846) designed by Robert Stevenson. Its structure was modified in 1871 and it has been refurbished on several further occasions, including repair work by Sir William Arrol & Co. in 1926.

The bridge is so named due to being the continuation of South Portland Street in Laurieston; however it is perpendicular to the better-known Carlton Place (a well-preserved cobbled street of Georgian terraces dating from the early 1800s) and so is sometimes known as Carlton Place Bridge or simply Glasgow Suspension Bridge although there is another bridge of this type upstream nearby. Both the bridge and the buildings of Carlton Place are category A listed.

See also

References

External links

Category A listed buildings in Glasgow
Bridges completed in 1853
Bridges in Glasgow
Bridges across the River Clyde
Pedestrian bridges in Scotland
Gorbals
1853 establishments in Scotland
Listed bridges in Scotland